Here on Earth may refer to:

 Here on Earth (novel), a novel by Alice Hoffman
 Here on Earth (film), a film starring Chris Klein and Leelee Sobieski 
 Here on Earth. An Argument for Hope, a 2011 anthropological book by Tim Flannery
 Here on Earth (album), a 2020 album by Tim McGraw
 Here on Earth (TV series), a Mexican political thriller television series
 Here on Earth - Radio Without Borders, a public radio program
 Aqui na Terra (Here on Earth), a Portuguese film directed by João Botelho
 Here on Earth, an album by Adequate Seven
"Here on Earth", song by Scarling from Sweet Heart Dealer 2004
"Here on Earth", song by Prince One Nite Alone...